Lorenzo Antonio Fernández (1792–1852) was a Uruguayan Roman Catholic priest and politician.

Nephew of Juan Francisco Larrobla, he played an important political role as a member of the Constituent and Legislative Assembly of the State and as the first rector of the University of the Republic.

Uruguayan politicians
1792 births
1852 deaths
19th-century Uruguayan Roman Catholic priests
University of the Republic (Uruguay) rectors
Apostolic vicars of Uruguay